Kalle Lindroth (born 3 August 1989 in Helsinki) is a Finnish musician, actor and television host. He is the lead singer of the rock band Smak, formed in 2001. As an actor Lindroth appeared in the television series Kotikatu, and as a host in Summeri and Bumtsibum.

Selected discography

Albums with Smak

Singles

References

External links

1989 births
Finnish male musicians
Finnish male actors
Living people